Elvis (also known as Elvis Presley No. 2) is the second studio album by  American rock and roll singer Elvis Presley. It was released through RCA Victor on October 19, 1956 in mono. Recording sessions took place on September 1, September 2, and September 3 at Radio Recorders in Hollywood, with one track left over from the sessions for Presley's debut album at the RCA Victor recording studios on January 30 in New York. It spent four weeks at #1 on the Billboard Top Pop Albums chart that year, making Presley the first recording artist to have both albums go straight to number one in the same year. It would go on to spend 5 weeks at #1 in total. It was certified Gold on February 17, 1960, and Platinum on August 10, 2011, by the Recording Industry Association of America.

It was originally released in UK in 1957 as Elvis Presley No. 2 with a different front cover (on His Master's Voice CLP1105). It was also cataloged as Rock 'n' Roll No. 2. The original U.S. release inaugurated the practice (applied inconsistently for the first few years, but commonly afterwards) of crediting Presley only by his first name on album sleeves, though his full name continued to be used on labels.

Content
RCA Victor producer Steve Sholes had commissioned two new songs for this batch of sessions, "Paralyzed" from Otis Blackwell and "Love Me" from Jerry Leiber and Mike Stoller, the authors of Presley's summer hit of 1956, "Hound Dog," the first record to top all three of the Billboard singles charts then in existence: Pop, R&B, and C&W. Presley decided upon three Little Richard covers, and selected three new country ballads respectively from regular Everly Brothers writer Boudleaux Bryant and guitarist Chet Atkins, Sun staff musician and engineer Stan Kesler, and Aaron Schroeder and Ben Weisman. The latter two, contracted to Hill and Range, the publishing company of Presley's manager, Colonel Tom Parker, would write dozens of songs for Presley through the 1960s. Also included was the song with which Presley won second prize at a fair in Tupelo when he was ten years old, Red Foley's 1941 country song, "Old Shep."

With all but one track on the album recorded at a single set of sessions over three days in September, Presley and his touring band of Scotty Moore, Bill Black, and D.J. Fontana, along with The Jordanaires, managed to recreate the loose feel from Sun Studio days, mixing rhythm and blues and country and western repertoire items as they had on all of his Sun singles. They reinforced this effect by including material echoing his very first Sun record: a blues by Arthur Crudup, author of "That's All Right (Mama);" and a song recorded by bluegrass founder Bill Monroe, "When My Blue Moon Turns to Gold Again."  The  sessions were attended by a few outsiders, namely his current girlfriend at the time, actress Natalie Wood and actor Nick Adams, both of whom had starred in Rebel Without a Cause, Presley's favorite James Dean film. Steve Sholes was the RCA man at the session, and handled the paper work and such, but Elvis himself chose the songs and led the session.

The piano player on this album is not registered in the official RCA Victor archives, except for the song "So Glad You're Mine", which was cut at a previous session in New York. In a 1984 interview conducted by Jan-Erik Kjeseth, Gordon Stoker of the Jordanaires stated that he was the piano player on most of the songs on the album. In an article written by Kjeseth for the Flaming Star magazine, it was argued that the piano player on "Love Me", "Old Shep" and "How's the World Treating You" was Elvis himself. Ernst Jørgensen, writer of Elvis Presley - A Study in Music, seems to be of the same opinion. Kjeseth also claims that Elvis played the piano on the single from this session, "Playing for Keeps". Again, Jørgensen seems to be of the same opinion. Gordon Stoker played the piano on "Rip it Up" and "Anyplace is Paradise".

Reissues
RCA first reissued the original 12 track album on compact disc in 1984. This issue, in reprocessed (fake) stereo sound, was quickly withdrawn and the disc was reissued in original mono. 
RCA reissued an expanded edition of the album  in 1999, and again in 2005. For the 1999 reissue, six bonus tracks were added that were both sides of three singles, altering the running order. Four of the tracks were chart-toppers: "Love Me Tender", "Too Much", and the double-sided classic "Hound Dog" and "Don't Be Cruel". Bonus tracks recorded on July 2 at RCA Studios in New York City, in September at Radio Recorders, and "Love Me Tender" at 20th Century Fox Stage One during the sessions for Love Me Tender. 
The 2005 reissue was remastered using DSD technology with the six bonus tracks appended in standard fashion, in the following order: "Playing for Keeps", "Too Much", "Don't Be Cruel", "Hound Dog", "Any Way You Want Me (That's How I Will Be)", and "Love Me Tender". This acclaimed latest remaster was the handiwork of audio restorer Kevan Budd, who also drew praise for his 2005 remasters of Presley's first and third albums (respectively, Elvis Presley and Loving You) as well as the 2004 upgrade known as Elvis at Sun. These rock-n'roll tapes may have been among those possibly dumped into the Delaware River near RCA Victor's Camden, New Jersey plant in the late 1950s.

In 2014, Elvis was reissued on the Follow That Dream label in a deluxe edition consisting of 2 discs packaged in a 7-inch sleeve.  The first disc contains the original album plus every known outtake from the Labor-Day 1956 sessions. The second disc features a live concert held at Hirsch Coliseum, Youth Center, Louisiana State Fairgrounds on December 15, 1956.

Personnel
 Elvis Presley – vocals, acoustic rhythm guitar, piano on "Old Shep", “Paralyzed", “First in Line”, "How's The World Treating You", and 1997 bonus track "Playing For Keeps“
 Scotty Moore – electric lead guitar
 Shorty Long – piano on “So Glad You’re Mine”
 Gordon Stoker - piano
 Bill Black – double bass
 D. J. Fontana – drums
 The Jordanaires (Gordon Stoker, Hoyt Hawkins, Neal Matthews, Hugh Jarrett) - backing vocals

Track listing

Original release

1999 edition

FTD release

Notes
Chart positions for LPM 1382 from Billboard Top Pop Albums chart; for singles from Billboard Pop Singles chart.

Charts

Weekly charts

Certifications

Notes

References
Jorgenson, Ernst. Elvis Presley: A Life In Music - The Complete Recording Sessions, 1998. New York: St. Martin's Press. Miller, Jim, ed. The Rolling Stone Illustrated History of Rock & Roll, revised first edition, 1980. New York: Random House.

External links

LPM-1382 Elvis Guide part of The Elvis Presley Record Research Database

1956 albums
Elvis Presley albums
Albums produced by Steve Sholes
RCA Victor albums
Albums recorded at Radio Recorders